Expressways in Korea or Motorways in Korea refer to:
Expressways in South Korea
Motorways in North Korea